William Morgan Farm is a historic farm located near Newark, New Castle County, Delaware. The property includes two contributing buildings. They are a stone bank barn (1809) and a stone dwelling (1813). The barn is constructed of uncoursed, rubble fieldstone and is cornered with large
fieldstone quoins. The house is a two-story, three bay, gable-roofed fieldstone building with an original two-story, gable-roofed rear ell.

It was added to the National Register of Historic Places in 1986.

References

External links

Farms on the National Register of Historic Places in Delaware
Houses completed in 1813
Houses in New Castle County, Delaware
National Register of Historic Places in New Castle County, Delaware